Ostrubel is the name given to a currency denominated in copecks and rubels, which was issued by Germany in 1916 for use in the eastern areas under German occupation ( and the Government General of Warsaw). It was initially equal to the Imperial rouble. The reason for the issue was a shortage of currency.

Denominations
The denominations available were:
 20 copecks;
 50 copecks;
 1 rubel;
 3 rubels;
 10 rubels;
 25 rubels;
 100 rubels.

The front sides of the banknotes carry a warning in German against forging banknotes. On the reverse sides is the same warning in Latvian (with old style orthography), Lithuanian and Polish.

There were also 1 copeck, 2 copeck and 3 copeck coins, made out of iron.

Aftermath

It was also still in use in a part of the Second Polish Republic during the first months of independence, until 29 April 1920.

References

Bibliography
  
 N. Jakimovs and V. Marcilger, The Postal and Monetary History of Latvia 1918–1945, own book, 1991, pp. 14-13–14-15.

External links

 German banknotes, a.o. Ostrubles and Ostmarks.

Currencies of Estonia
Currencies of Germany
Currencies of Latvia
Currencies of Lithuania
Currencies of Poland
Currencies of Russia
German Empire in World War I
Modern obsolete currencies
1916 establishments in Germany
1922 disestablishments